Solar Wind is an album by pianist Ramsey Lewis which was recorded in 1974 and released on the Columbia label. It was partly recorded in Memphis with former Stax producer and session guitarist, Steve Cropper, a member of the Booker T and the MGs group.

Reception

Allmusic awarded the album 2 stars.

Track listing
 "Sweet and Tender You" (Steve Cropper, Carl Marsh) - 5:47  
 "Hummingbird" (Jim Seals, Dash Crofts) - 4:52  
 "Solar Wind" (Cropper, Marsh) - 3:15  
 "Jamaican Marketplace" (Cleveland Eaton, Ramsey Lewis) - 7:16  
 "The Everywhere Calypso" (Sonny Rollins) - 2:59  
 "Summer Breeze" (Seals, Crofts) - 4:51  
 "Loves Me Like a Rock" (Paul Simon) - 4:30  
 "Come Down in Time" (Elton John, Bernie Taupin) - 4:53  
 "Love For a Day" (Cropper, Carl Marsh) - 4:56  
 Recorded at Trans Maximus Inc. Recording Studios, Memphis (tracks 1, 7 & 9) and CBS Recording Studios, Chicago (tracks 2-6 & 8)

Personnel 
Ramsey Lewis - keyboards, ARP and Moog
Cleveland Eaton - bass, electric bass
Morris Jennings  - drums, percussion
James L. Herson - Moog (tracks 2, 6 & 8)
Calvin Barnes - percussion (tracks 4 & 5)
Carl Marsh, Ron Capone - drums (track 3)
Steve Cropper - guitar (tracks 1, 3, 7 & 9)

References 

1974 albums
Ramsey Lewis albums
Albums produced by Steve Cropper
Columbia Records albums